The  was a shōen, or great landed estate, located in what is now the cities of Tainai and Shibata, Niigata Prefecture in the Hokuriku region of Japan, from the end of the Heian period through the Sengoku period.

Overview
Shōen were private, tax-free, autonomous feudal manors which arose after the decay of the ritsuryō system. Hereditary landowners, often descendants of estate managers sent by the original stakeholders, commended shares of the revenue produced to more powerful leaders at the court, in return for protection of their independence and tax-free status. The foundation of the estate in the late Heian era is uncertain, but it was held by the Jō clan (城氏), who had the status of a "pioneer developer" (開発領主) and who nominally commended his revenues to one of the Five regent houses. However, after the establishment of the Kamakura shogunate, the estate was awarded to Wada Yoshimochi, the brother of Wada Yoshimori, one of Minamoto no Yoritomo's senior retainers.  The Wada clan had the post of Jitō, but continued to retain the Jō clan to manage the estate. Even after the purge of the Wada clan in 1213, the cadet branch at Okuyama, was split into three branches: the Hōjō, Nakajō and Nanjō clans after the death of Wada Yoshimori. During the late Muromachi period, the Nakajō clan became retainers of the Nagao clan and from thence were in the service of the Uesugi clan.  They relocated from the Egami Fortified Residence to Tossaka Castle around 1453. In the Sengoku period, they relocated to Aizu with Uesugi Kagekatsu and the name of disappears from history.

The National Historic Site designation includes the following sites:

)

These thirteen sites include the ruins of castle buildings, religious sites, and production sites. The Egami Fortified Residence ruins were excavated from 1991, with the complete foundations of the main building and adjacent south and north buildings discovered, together with a large amount of Suzu ware and other pottery from the 13th century to the early 16th century. The site also contained four bridges, foundations of the south gate and north gate, and several portions of the moat and earthen ramparts. A small museum exists near this ruin, which is about 20 minutes by car from Nakajo Station on the JR East Uetsu Main Line.

See also
List of Historic Sites of Japan (Niigata)

References

External links
Niigata tourist information 
Castles of the Hokuriku region

Muromachi period
History of Niigata Prefecture
Tainai, Niigata
Shibata, Niigata
Historic Sites of Japan